Banning Municipal Airport  is a city-owned airport a mile southeast of Banning, in Riverside County, California.

Facilities
Its one runway, 8/26, is 4,955 by 100 feet (1,510 x 30 m) asphalt.

In the year ending December 31, 2020, the airport had 5,495 general aviation operations, an average of 105 per week. In December 2021, 16 aircraft were then based at the airport; 13 single-engine, 2 multi-engine, and 1 helicopter.

References

External links 
 Aerial image as of 28 May 2002 from USGS The National Map

Airports in Riverside County, California
Banning, California
San Gorgonio Pass
Airfields of the United States Army Air Forces in California
United States Army airfields